Delirious is a 1991 American romantic comedy-drama film starring John Candy, Mariel Hemingway, Emma Samms, Raymond Burr, in his last feature film role, David Rasche, Dylan Baker, and Charles Rocket. The film used Prince's 1982 song as its title theme.

Plot
Jack Gable is the lead writer and producer of the soap opera Beyond Our Dreams. Consumed by work, he harbors an unspoken attraction to Laura Claybourne, the selfish actress playing the lead character, Rachel Hedison.

Jack crosses paths with Louise, who is there to audition for the part of Janet DuBois, a character Jack did not want introduced. Jack then has a contentious meeting with his co-producers, the Sherwoods. The Sherwoods reveal that they are displeased with several elements of Jack's outline for the upcoming season and wish to kill off Rachel, due to Laura's outrageous contract demands. Feigning compromise, the Sherwoods immediately hire Arnie Federman, a rival of Jack's, to make the changes they desire. At the same time, Jack has suggested a new character, Jack Gates, a ruthless tycoon. The Sherwoods make no promise of writing Gates into the show, despite Jack's interest.

Planning a trip to Vermont for the weekend, Jack is contacted by Laura. She has just broken up with her boyfriend Dennis, the actor who plays Dr. Paul Kirkwood on the show, and wishes to accompany Jack. As Jack loads their luggage into the trunk, Dennis suddenly calls out to Laura. Jack looks up to see them kissing just as the trunk lid hits him in the head. Upon awakening, he leaves for Vermont alone. Not far out of New York, he crashes his car.

Upon waking, Jack finds himself in Ashford Falls Community Hospital, one of the settings of his show. Thinking himself the victim of a prank by the actors, he goes to the window to confirm his suspicions, only to see a real town. Incredulous, he manages to convince Dr. Kirkwood of his good health and checks out of the hospital. He is immediately intercepted by Janet DuBois. She believes him to be Jack Gates, who is seeking to buy a miracle weight-loss formula developed by her late father. Jack rebuffs her, denies he is Gates and says that he is only a writer. As she leaves in frustration, she angrily tells him to "write his way out". On a whim, Jack gets out his typewriter and writes a scene of the local mechanic calling to say that his damaged car is fixed. Immediately after, the mechanic calls and confirms the repairs are finished. Jack realizes that he can control events by writing them.

Jack seizes his newfound power to pursue Rachel in the guise of Jack Gates, saving her from the death arranged for her by Federman. Although she is engaged to Paul, she becomes attracted to Jack slowly through rescuing her from a spooked horse and later, donating his Ferrari 250 GT to one of her charities. At the same time he has mutual attraction to Janet. He assists her in her efforts to avoid the machinations of the Hedisons, including patriarch Carter and his sons, Blake and Ty. The Hedisons own a large pharmaceutical company, and wish to acquire her formula at any cost. The Federman version of Jack Gates (Robert Wagner as himself) appears, but Jack sends him on a business trip to Cleveland.

As Jack works to ingratiate himself to Rachel, he continues to run into Janet. The episodes culminate in a party at the Hedison mansion, where Rachel has conspired with her family to obtain the secret formula which Janet entrusted to Jack. Before the party, Jack finds the whole episode foolish and drunk in his hotel room, breaks his typewriter by tossing it off the table.  Helen Caldwell, a nurse at the hospital reveals that Rachel and Janet were switched at birth, with Janet being Carter's actual daughter. Rachel is confronted by a gun-wielding Blake, who has been experiencing side effects of an overdose of medication prescribed by Kirkwood, a scheme orchestrated by Rachel. Blake accidentally shoots Janet and she is rushed to the hospital, where Rachel convinces Kirkwood to kill her in surgery. Jack must race against time to repair his typewriter and write Janet back to health. As Jack begins to write, he is confronted by Gates, who is furious at having been sent to Cleveland and shoots Jack with a shotgun, hitting the typewriter.

Jack wakes up back in New York, on the set of his own show, tended to by Laura and Dennis. He immediately confronts Laura about her behavior, revealing to her that she will be fired from the show. He confronts the Sherwoods about their plans for the show, and ensures that they will do things his way. He finds Louise in a delicatessen, gets her the part of Janet, and begins a relationship with her.

Cast

 John Candy as Jack Gable
 Mariel Hemingway as Janet DuBois/Louise 
 Emma Samms as Rachel Hedison/Laura Claybourne
 David Rasche as Dr. Paul Kirkwood/Dennis
 Charles Rocket as Ty Hedison
 Dylan Baker as Blake Hedison
 Jerry Orbach as Lou Sherwood
 Renée Taylor as Arlene Sherwood
 Raymond Burr as Carter Hedison
 Andrea Thompson as Nurse Helen Caldwell/Lee
 Zach Grenier as Mickey
 Marvin Kaplan as Typewriter Repairman
 Milt Oberman as Arnie Federman
 Mark Boone Junior as Cable Man
 Robert Wagner as Jack Gates (uncredited)
 Margot Kidder as Woman in restroom (uncredited)

Reception
On Rotten Tomatoes, the film has an approval rating of 29% based on 21 reviews, with an average rating of 5.3/10. The website's critics consensus reads: "Delirious benefits from John Candy's sweet screen presence, but it's nowhere near enough to compensate for a woefully unfunny script." Audiences surveyed by CinemaScore gave the film a grade "C+" on scale of A to F.

References

External links
 
 

1991 films
1990s fantasy comedy films
Self-reflexive films
Metro-Goldwyn-Mayer films
Films scored by Cliff Eidelman
Films directed by Tom Mankiewicz
Films about writers
Films set in New York City
Films about soap operas
American fantasy comedy films
1991 comedy films
1990s English-language films
1990s American films